Hemiculterella macrolepis is a species of cyprinid in the genus Hemiculterella. It is found in Laos and in the Mekong in the Yunnan province of China.

References

Cyprinidae